Marcos Bezerra Abbott Galvão (born 14 January 1959) is a Brazilian diplomat, current Brazilian Ambassador to the European Union in Brussels, Belgium. From 22 February 2017 to 7 March 2017, Galvão was Acting Minister of Foreign Affairs.

Biography
Born in 1959, Galvão graduated at Rio Branco Institute, the Brazilian diplomatic academy, and concluded his master's degree in International Affairs at American University in Washington D.C., in the United States. Joined the diplomatic career, as third secretary, on 2 September 1980.

In the Ministry of Foreign Affairs, he acted in many offices, such as advisor to the secretary general (1982–84) and Deputy Chief of Staff and Press Secretary of the Minister (1998–2001). In other government agencies, he served in the Diplomatic Advisory office of the Presidency of the Republic (1990–92), advisor for the Minister of Finances (1994), Chief of Staff of the Ministry of the Environment (1993–94) and of the Ministry of Finances (2005–07). Galvão was Secretary of Foreign Affairs of the Ministry of Finances and main negotiator for the Ministry in the process of the G20 (2008–10). He was Secretary-General of Foreign Affairs (deputy Foreign Minister) from 25 May 2016 to 31 December 2018.

In foreign countries, Galvão served in the Brazilian Mission to the Organization of American States, in Washington D.C. (1984–87), in the Embassy of Asunción, Paraguay (1987–89), the Embassy of London, UK (1995–98) and the Embassy of Washington D.C., U.S. (2001–05), where he was minister-advisor and Chargé d'Affaires. From January 2011 to October 2013, he was Brazilian Ambassador to Japan and, after that, Brazilian permanent representative to the World Trade Organization (WTO) and other economic organizations in Geneva (2013–16). Since February 2019 he is the ambassador of Brazil to the European Union.

He taught many courses in Rio Branco Institute, such as Diplomatic Language and Brazilian Foreign Politics.

In May 2018, Galvão was nominated by president Michel Temer as Brazilian Ambassador to the European Union. The nomination was approved by the Federal Senate in the same month.

See also
 Ministry of Foreign Affairs
 Ambassadors of Brazil

References

External links
 Official website of the Ministry of Foreign Affairs (in Portuguese)

|-

1959 births
Living people
People from New York City
Brazilian diplomats
Foreign ministers of Brazil